Weldon Nelson Rogers (30 October 1927 Marietta, Oklahoma – 13 September 2004, Perryton, Texas) was an American songwriter, singer of country and rockabilly, radio disc jockey, and record producer. He co-founded Je–Wel Records with Jean Oliver ( Bobbie Jean Oliver; 1939–2008) to produce, as Je-Wel's first record, the first record for The Teen Kings in 1956. Oliver's father, Chester Oliver ( Chester Calvin Oliver; 1907–2000), an oil and gas industry lease pumper, provided financial backing for the Je–Wel label.

Teen Kings
The members of The Teen Kings were:
Roy Orbison (1936–1988) – vocals, guitar
Jack Kennelly (1937–2009) – upright bass
Peanuts Wilson (1935–1980) – rhythm guitar
James Emitt Morrow (1936–2020) – electric mandolin (played through an Echoplex)
Billy Pat Ellis – drums

The Teen Kings first record (and Orbison's first recording) was:

 Je-Wel 101
 Side A: "Trying to Get You", by Charles Singleton and Rose Marie McCoy
 Side B: "Ooby Dooby", by Wade Moore and Dick Penner

Selected discography
Original releases

Re-releases
 Weldon Rogers, Tryin' To Get To You, Bear Family Records, (January 26, 1998) (CD) 
Track   Song

 "So Long, Good Luck, Goodbye"
 "Trying To Get To You"
 "Sale of Broken Hearts"
 "My Only Love"
 "Please Return My Broken Heart"
 "I'm Building a ???" ("On the Moon")
 "Dim Lights, Thick Smoke" ("and Loud, Loud Music")
 "For Always, Yes Forever"
 "Everybody Wants You"
 "I Still Want You"
 "I'm Gonna Be Around"
 "If I Had One Day to Live"
 "Lying Lips and a Cheatin' Heart"
 "You Made Me Love You"
 "Talk Of The Town"
 "That Was in the Deal"
 "Bright Lights"
 "This Song Is Just For You"
 "Back Door of Heaven"
 "Cimarron"
 "As Long As You Are Mine"
 "Living With a Heartache"
 "Our Rendezvous"
 "I'm Gonna Love Again"
 "I Lost the Moon"
 "I Haven't Seen Myself in Years"
 "Mr. Mountain Lion"
 "I've Got the Yearning"
 "Would You Still Want Me"

Re-releases via MP3 downloads
<li> Doo Wop Finders Keepers. Vol. 3
Label: Ling Music Group (May 27, 2011)
<li> "Tryin' to Get to You"
 The Ultimate 50's Rockin' Sci-Fi Disc
The Viper Label (October 12, 2009)

 "I'm Building a ???" ("On the Moon")

Compositions recorded by other artists
Rogers' composition, "So Long, Good Luck and Goodbye", was recorded by Bob Dylan.

Compositions

 "So Long, Good Luck, and Goodbye", w & m Weldon Rogers (©1957)
 "Sale of Broken Hearts", w & m Weldon Rogers (©1957)
 "Lying Lips and Cheating Heart", w & m Weldon Rogers (©1960)
 "If I Had One Day to Live", w & m Weldon Rogers (©1960)
 "I've Got the Yearning", w Wanda Rogers, m Weldon Rogers (©1961)
 "As Long as You Are Mine", w Weldon Rogers, m Wanda Rogers (©1962)
 "Heaven in Your Arms", w Wanda Rogers, m Weldon Rogers (©1963)
 "I'm Hanging Up the Phone", w Wanda Rogers, m Weldon Rogers (©1963)
 "Longest Night", w Weldon Rogers, m Wanda Rogers (©1965)
 "Two Empty Glasses", w Wanda Rogers, m Weldon Rogers (©1965)
 "Longest Night", w Weldon Rogers, m Wanda Rogers (©1965)
 "Old Memories Keep Returning", w & m Weldon Rogers (©1965)
 "That Was in the Deal", by Weldon Rogers (©1966; ©1980)
 "I Haven't Seen Myself in Years" (©1968)
 "Would You Still Want Me?" (©1968)
 "Mr. Mountain Lion" (©1968)
 "Our Rendezvous" (©1969)
 "How Times Have Changed" (©1971)
 "I Lost the Moon" (©1972)
 "I'm Gonna Love Again" (©1972)
 "Bad Boy Slippin' Out of Me" (©2008)

Family
Weldon was one of five children born to Otto Brigamyer Rogers (1903–1966) and Sadie Josephine Clifton ( 1908–1997) who were farmers. Weldon Rogers – on February 27, 1959, in Tijuana, Mexico – married singer and songwriter Wanda Faye Rogers (1929–1910). Both of them had been married before. They divorced October 2, 1967, in Jackson County, Oregon.

Weldon Nelson Rogers died September 13, 2004, in Perryton, Texas, and is buried in the Ochiltree Cemetery, Perryton, Texas.

Bibliography

Annotations

Notes

References

 . . .
<li> "Wilson, Johnny Ancil (Peanuts)". p. 547.

 . .

 

  .

 .

 

 

 
 (author bio: "Tony Wilkinson Obituary", 2013, by John Howard, UK ROCK Magazine).

External links
 Weldon Rogers biography
 Peanuts Wilson biography
 Nelson Rogers' website (Weldon and Faye's son)
 Wanda Faye's biography
 Billie Jean Oliver's obituary

1927 births
2004 deaths
Record producers from Oklahoma
Record producers from Texas
American country singers
American country songwriters
Songwriters from Texas
People from Marietta, Oklahoma
20th-century American musicians
Songwriters from Oklahoma
20th-century American singers
Country musicians from Texas
Country musicians from Oklahoma